The second Battle of Dorylaeum took place near Dorylaeum in October 1147, during the Second Crusade. It was not a single clash but consisted of a series of encounters over a number of days. The German crusader forces of   Conrad III were defeated by the Seljuk Turks led by Sultan Mesud I.

Background

Following escalating friction between the Byzantine Empire and the German crusader army, including armed clashes, the Germans were ferried from the environs of Constantinople to the Asiatic shores of the Bosphorus. With inadequate supplies, the crusaders moved into the interior of Anatolia, intending to take the overland route to the Holy Land.

Running battle
As the crusaders crossed into the Anatolian plateau they entered an area of debatable frontier districts between the Byzantines and Seljuk Turks. Once beyond effective Byzantine control, the German army came under constant harassing attacks from the Turks, who excelled at such tactics. The poorer, and less well-supplied, infantry of the crusader army were the most vulnerable to hit-and-run horse archer attack and began to take casualties and lose men to capture. The area through which the crusaders were marching was largely barren and parched; therefore the army could not augment its supplies and was troubled by thirst. When the Germans were about three days march beyond Dorylaeum, the nobility requested that the army turn back and regroup. As the crusaders began their retreat, on 25 October, the Turkish attacks intensified and order broke down, the retreat then becoming a rout with the Crusaders taking heavy casualties. Conrad, himself, was wounded by arrows during the rout. The Crusaders lost virtually all of their baggage and, according to the Syriac Chronicle, "The Turks grew rich for they had taken gold and silver like pebbles with no end."

Aftermath and estimation of crusader losses

On regaining lands under firm Byzantine control Turkish attacks ceased. The failure of the crusaders was partly blamed on Byzantine treachery by the contemporary chronicler William of Tyre, the Greek guides and local population were accused of being in league with the Seljuks. However, convincing evidence or motivation for this scenario is lacking, though the Byzantine emperor, Manuel I, had hurriedly arranged a peace treaty with the Seljuk sultan. German losses are difficult to estimate, William of Tyre stating that only a remnant of the army was left. Of the 113 named men in the army, 22 are recorded to have died on the crusade, 42 to have survived and 49 are unaccounted for. However, the named men would have been of the knightly and noble class, who, being better armoured and provisioned than the infantry, were more likely to survive. The detailed fate of a significant proportion of the German army shows that the notion of it being completely destroyed near Dorylaeum is untenable. Nicolle states that the 'professional core' of Conrad's army, i.e. the knights and other cavalry, remained "largely intact", though with shaken morale.

The Germans subsequently joined forces with the French crusaders, led by Louis VII of France, at Nicaea, before proceeding along the coastal route around western Anatolia. The joint forces came under renewed Seljuk attack, and Conrad and the elite of his force took ship at Ephesus. Conrad returned by sea to Constantinople, where he was reconciled with the Byzantine emperor. The remainder of the German crusaders, in company with the French, moved on to Attalia, some were then shipped to Antioch. Of those who attempted the overland route to Antioch there is no accurate record of the number of survivors. Manuel I later provided ships to take Conrad and his entourage to Palestine. The Second Crusade eventually failed in its attempt to take the city of Damascus.

The anonymous German author of Annales Herbipolenses, a native of Würzburg, speaks of meeting many returned soldiers, presumably of the wealthier section of the army. They had been captured by the Turks, and had been ransomed by, or through the mediation of, the Armenians of Cilicia.

Notes

References

Bibliography

External links
 Boise State - Crusades

Battles of the Second Crusade
Battles involving the Sultanate of Rum
Conflicts in 1147
History of Eskişehir Province
1147 in Asia